Portevinia maculata, also known as the Ramsons hoverfly, is a European species of hoverfly. The adults can be found around Allium species when the plants are in flower (May–June). The larvae tunnel through and overwinter in the bulbs of this plant.

Description
External images
For terms see Morphology of Diptera
Tergites 2-4 with grey spots. Face very concave for upper two-thirds. Antennae red. 
See references for determination

Distribution
Palearctic Southern Norway to North Spain. Ireland East into Northern Europe and Central Europe as far as Liechtenstein, Austria and northern Italy.

It can be found in the following countries: Austria, Belgium, Czechia, Denmark, France, Germany, Ireland, Italy, Liechtenstein, Montenegro, Netherlands, Norway, Poland, Romania, Slovakia, Spain, Sweden, Switzerland, Ukraine and the United Kingdom.

Habitat
Portevinia maculata lives in deciduous woodland glades where Allium ursinum or Allium triquetrum also grow. It can be found at elevations up to 2000 metres above sea level.

References

Diptera of Europe
Eristalinae
Insects described in 1817
Taxa named by Carl Fredrik Fallén